Gulripshi (Gwylryphsh; , ; , Gulrypsh) is an urban settlement in Abkhazia. It is located 12 km from Sukhumi, and is the capital of Gulripshi District.

Nikolay Smetskoy built three sanatoria in Gulripshi between 1902 and 1913 for patients with pulmonary diseases and founded several parks with subtropical plants. After the Russian Revolution the sanatoria were nationalised.

Climate
Gulripshi has a humid subtropical climate (Köppen: Cfa).

See also
 Gulripshi District

References 

Populated places in Gulripshi District
Sukhum Okrug